The 1897–98 season was the 6th season of competitive football played by Liverpool and was their 5th season in The Football League, in which they competed in the first division. The season sporty covers the period from 1 July 1897 to 30 June 1898. After finishing in fifth place the previous season, Liverpool fell four spots to finish in ninth place at the end of the season with 28 points, 14 points behind the champions in Sheffield United.

References

External links
LFC History Season 1896-97
1897–98 Liverpool F.C.Results
LFC Kit 1897-98

1897-1898
English football clubs 1897–98 season